Büttgen station is a railway station in the town of Büttgen, a part of Kaarst in North Rhine-Westphalia, Germany. The station was opened on 8 January 1868. Büttgen station has two tracks and two platforms and is classified by Deutsche Bahn as a category 5 station.

The station is served by the S 8 line of the Rhine-Ruhr S-Bahn network, running between Mönchengladbach and Wuppertal-Oberbarmen or Hagen every 20 minutes at weekday core times.

References

S8 (Rhine-Ruhr S-Bahn)
Rhine-Ruhr S-Bahn stations
Railway stations in Germany opened in 1868
1868 establishments in Prussia
Buildings and structures in Rhein-Kreis Neuss